Salvia cyanocephala is an uncommon perennial that is endemic to Colombia, typically found near streams in bushy areas at  elevation.

References

External links
United States National Herbarium (US:Botany) via herbariovaa.org

cyanocephala
Endemic flora of Colombia